Justicia cuneata is a species of shrub in the genus Justicia. It is endemic to the Cape Provinces of South Africa.

Distribution 
Justicia cuneata is found from the Richtersveld through Namaqualand to the Knersvlakte and Sandveld, and from the Little Karoo and southern Great Karoo to near Port Elizabeth.

Conservation status 
Justicia cuneata is classified as Least Concern as it is widespread and not in decline.

References

External links 
 

Endemic flora of South Africa
Flora of South Africa
Flora of the Cape Provinces
cuneata